Pichinikkadu is a sub village of Athivetti, in India.

Villages in Thanjavur district